Yamamotozephyrus is a butterfly genus in the family Lycaenidae. It is monotypic, containing only the species Yamamotozephyrus kwangtungensis.
There are three subspecies
Yamamotozephyrus kwangtungensis (Forster, 1942) China (Kwangtung)
Y. k. hainana (Koiwaya, 1993) Hainan
Y. k. mayhkaensis Watanabe, 2000 Myanmar

References

Theclini
Lycaenidae genera
Monotypic butterfly genera